"Hello Me" is a song by the Australian singer Vanessa Amorosi, released on 6 September 2019 as the second single from her fifth studio album, Back to Love.
Amorosi performed the song live on Sunrise on 9 September 2019.
 
Amorosi said the song is a "raw, intimate song about setting boundaries and making choices".

Charts

References

 
2019 singles
Vanessa Amorosi songs
Songs written by Vanessa Amorosi
Songs written by Aleena Gibson
2019 songs